"Cry Baby Cry" is a song by the English rock band the Beatles from their 1968 double album The Beatles (also known as the "White Album"). It was written by John Lennon and credited to the Lennon–McCartney partnership. The coda of the song is a short segment referred to as "Can You Take Me Back", written by Paul McCartney, which was actually an outtake from the "I Will" session.

Composition
Demos indicate that Lennon composed the song in late 1967. The original lyrics were "Cry baby cry, make your mother buy." Lennon described to biographer Hunter Davies how he got the words from an advertisement. Some of the lyrics of the song are loosely based on the nursery rhyme "Sing a Song of Sixpence".

Recording
Engineer Geoff Emerick resigned during the recording of "Cry Baby Cry". His departure was precipitated by Lennon and McCartney's obsessions over the recording of both "Revolution" and "Ob-La-Di, Ob-La-Da", respectively, and the overall tensions of the sessions. Emerick did not work with the Beatles again until the session for "The Ballad of John and Yoko" nine months later.

After a day-long rehearsal, on 16 July 1968 the basic tracks were laid down for Lennon's guitar part and his vocal on the introduction, McCartney's bass and Ringo Starr's drums, along with Lennon's piano and George Martin's harmonium. All other parts were dubbed in two days later: Lennon's lead vocal, Lennon/McCartney falsetto backing vocals and tambourines, Martin's harmonium introduction, sound effects for tea, and George Harrison's lead guitar – a Gibson Les Paul borrowed from Eric Clapton and soon to be a permanent gift.

"Can You Take Me Back?"
The song is followed on the album by an unrelated and unlisted track, ad libbed and sung by Paul McCartney. Though the song originally had no official name, it had popularly become known as "Can You Take Me Back?" after the primary lyric of the song, and has been officially deemed so on the track listing for the 50th anniversary edition of The Beatles, where an unabridged version of the song is referred to as "Can You Take Me Back? (Take 1)" and included among the bonus tracks. The hidden track is an improvised jam recorded by McCartney during a 16 September 1968 session for "I Will".

Legacy
Coinciding with the 50th anniversary of its release, Jacob Stolworthy of The Independent listed "Cry Baby Cry" at number 19 in his ranking of the White Album's 30 tracks. He wrote of the song: "Lennon translated elements of the nursery rhyme 'Sing a Song of Sixpence' for this effort, which comes with an added eerie McCartney segment titled "Can You Take Me Back?" He said that the song is "unremarkable, but remains easy listening".

Personnel
According to Ian MacDonald:

"Cry Baby Cry"
John Lennon – lead vocal and harmony vocal, falsetto vocals, acoustic guitar, piano, organ
Paul McCartney – bass guitar, falsetto vocals
George Harrison – lead guitar
Ringo Starr – drums, tambourine
George Martin – harmonium

"Can You Take Me Back?" 
Paul McCartney – lead vocal, acoustic guitar
John Lennon – percussion, maracas
Ringo Starr – bongos

Cover versions
Ramsey Lewis recorded an instrumental version of this song on his 1968 album Mother Nature's Son.
Commander Cody and His Lost Planet Airmen covered this song on the 1987 album Flying Dreams.
The jam band Phish covered this song as part of its near-complete 1994 cover of the White Album released on Live Phish Volume 13, and in 1998 on Hampton Comes Alive. The 1994 version includes "Can You Take Me Back" while the 1998 does not.

Notes

References

External links
 

The Beatles songs
1968 songs
Song recordings produced by George Martin
Songs written by Lennon–McCartney
Songs published by Northern Songs
Katie Melua songs